Teen Spirit is a 2018 musical drama film written and directed by Max Minghella (in his directorial debut). The film stars Elle Fanning, Rebecca Hall, and Zlatko Burić.

The film had its world premiere at the Toronto International Film Festival on September 7, 2018. It was released in the United States on April 12, 2019, by LD Entertainment and Bleecker Street, and in the United Kingdom on July 26, 2019, by Lionsgate.

Plot
Violet, a shy teenager living in a small village on the Isle of Wight, dreams of pop stardom as an escape from her dismal surroundings and shattered family life. Behind her mother's back she sings in a near-empty bar. Afterward an older man, Vlad, approaches her to say she was good. He says he used to be an opera singer in Croatia. Violet doesn't trust him and says she is 21 to discourage his interest.

Later, Violet enters a UK singing competition and doesn't tell her mother as she thinks Violet should only sing in church. Violet tries out for Teen Spirit UK alongside many classmates and reaches the next day auditions. She tells the organiser she is 17 and the woman says she'll need to bring a parent or guardian with her tomorrow to give permission for her participation in the competition. She can't ask her family, so she asks Vlad for help and explains she lied about her age to him. He says he'll help but if she wins he will be her manager and take 50% of her earnings. At the next round she is told she is invited back but must work on her performance and breathing. Vlad says he will train her and they tell her mother.

Her mother is suspicious of Vlad, asking 'what will you get out of it?' He says 50% if she succeeds as a singer. The mother says only 15%, that is what managers get. He agrees. In the next round she comes second and returns home, so does not make the London final.

Her mother sells her horse to cover debts. Violet is pursued by a boy from school, Luke, who is in a band. Then she hears that the heat winner gave a false name and had entered the competition in a previous year, so has been disqualified. Violet starts singing with Luke's band. Vlad brings Violet's mother flowers. The church says prayers for Violet. They all go to London for the final.

In the hotel the night before the event a woman called Jules offers Violet a record contract - but it must be signed before the final. Vlad is suspicious and says he must read it first. He sees that if Violet signs it, he will be removed from working with her. Violet dresses up to socialise and goes to meet her band friends in a club... She ends up drinking and making out with Keyan, last year's winner, who she met earlier in Jules' room.

Her band mates see she is drunk and try to take Violet back to the hotel. Vlad storms in and carries her out of the club. Violet is angry and says she will sign the contract. Vlad walks off saying he is getting a drink.

Next morning Violet realises she has lost the gold crucifix her mother gave her. Vlad wakes up on a park bench but returns to the hotel. Jules gives Violet her crucifix back. The competition proceeds with an ensemble song from all the finalists, and Violet worries about Vlad. Eventually, Vlad shows up and Violet says she didn't sign the contract. They reconcile before Violet appears on stage for her song.

She gives it her all using the training Vlad gave her and a much bigger dance style. Her backing band congratulates her, her mother rings to say she is proud, and Vlad tells her she 'did it!' And she was 'so good'.

Vlad gets a train to Paris to meet his estranged daughter. We see Violet on a train with the winner's trophy beside her.

Cast

Production
On January 30, 2017, it was revealed that actor Max Minghella would be making his directorial debut with Teen Spirit from a screenplay that he wrote. It was also revealed that the film would be launched to buyers at the European Film Market in Berlin in the following month. On February 10, 2017, it was announced that Elle Fanning would star in the film, which, at the time, was in pre-production and was being sold to international buyers at the European Film Market. On July 11, 2017, it was announced that principal production for Teen Spirit had commenced in London, England, with the rest of the cast confirmed as well.

As part of her preparation for the role of Violet, Elle Fanning had her ears pierced for the first time, getting three piercings in each ear.

In September 2018, a teaser trailer was released, revealing Rebecca Hall as having joined the cast. Additionally, it was announced that the film would feature performances of and music written by Robyn, Ellie Goulding, Ariana Grande, Katy Perry, Tegan & Sara, Annie Lennox, Orbital, Alice Deejay, The Undertones, Major Lazer, Grimes, Whigfield, and Sigrid, and an original song "Wildflowers" written by Carly Rae Jepsen and produced by Jack Antonoff.

Release
Teen Spirit had its world premiere at the Toronto International Film Festival on September 7, 2018.
Shortly after, Lionsgate and LD Entertainment acquired British and US distribution rights respectively, with Bleecker Street co-distributing the film in the United States with LD Entertainment. It was released in the United States on April 12, 2019, and in the United Kingdom on July 26, 2019.

Reception

Box office
After a week of playing in four theaters the film expanded to 696, and grossed $250,536 over the weekend.

Critical response
The website's critical consensus reads, "Teen Spirit tells a story we know by heart, but writer-director Max Minghella's connection to the material and Elle Fanning's remarkable performance add an effective hook." On Metacritic, the film has a weighted average score of 57 out of 100, based on 24 critics, indicating "mixed or average reviews".

Teen Spirit was selected as a Critic's Pick by The New York Times. Jeannette Catsoulis writes "Max Minghella's sweet and touching directing debut, is both proudly clichéd and refreshingly different."

Soundtrack

The Teen Spirit Original Soundtrack was released on April 5, 2019, by label Interscope Records, features tracks by Elle Fanning, No Doubt, Major Lazer, Grimes, Orbital and an original song written by Carly Rae Jepsen (Wildflowers). The soundtrack's first single "Wildflowers" was released on March 29, 2019, and music video was released on April 5, 2019.

Track listing

 Grimes – "Genesis" 
 Elle Fanning – "I Was a Fool"
Marius de Vries & Eldad Guetta featuring Elle Fanning – "E.T."
No Doubt – "Just a Girl"
Elle Fanning – "Dancing on My Own"
Elle Fanning – "Lights"
Elle Fanning – "Little Bird"
Major Lazer featuring MØ & DJ Snake – "Lean On"
Elle Fanning & Teen Spirit Finalists – "Good Time"
The Shades – "Teenage Kicks"
Clara Rugaard – "Tattooed Heart"
Elle Fanning – "Don't Kill My Vibe"
Orbital featuring Elle Fanning – "Halycon Teen Spirit"
Elle Fanning – "Wildflowers"

References

External links
 
 
 

2018 films
2018 directorial debut films
2018 drama films
2010s coming-of-age drama films
2010s musical drama films
2010s teen drama films
American coming-of-age drama films
American musical drama films
American teen drama films
American teen musical films
British coming-of-age drama films
British musical drama films
British teen drama films
Films about competitions
Films about singers
Films scored by Marius de Vries
Films set on the Isle of Wight
Films set in London
Films shot in London
2010s English-language films
2010s American films
2010s British films